The Woodhaven Boulevard station is a local station on the IND Queens Boulevard Line of the New York City Subway, consisting of four tracks. Located in Elmhurst, Queens, it is served by the M train on weekdays, the R train at all times except nights, and the E and F trains at night. The station serves the adjacent Queens Center Mall, as well as numerous bus lines.

Woodhaven Boulevard was opened on December 31, 1936, as Woodhaven Boulevard–Slattery Plaza. At the time, the station was part of the Independent Subway System. The plaza was demolished in the 1950s, but the name tablets displaying the station's original name were kept. In the 1980s, the Woodhaven Boulevard station was renamed after Queens Center, an adjacent shopping mall. The station was renovated in the 1990s.

History

Construction and opening
The Queens Boulevard Line was one of the first built by the city-owned Independent Subway System (IND), and was planned to stretch between the IND Eighth Avenue Line in Manhattan and 178th Street and Hillside Avenue in Jamaica, Queens, with a stop at Woodhaven Boulevard. The line was first proposed in 1925. Construction of the line was approved by the New York City Board of Estimate on October 4, 1928. The line was constructed using the cut-and-cover tunneling method, and to allow pedestrians to cross, temporary bridges were built over the trenches.

The first section of the line opened on August 19, 1933 from the connection to the Eighth Avenue Line at 50th Street to Roosevelt Avenue in Jackson Heights. Later that year, a $23 million loan was approved to finance the remainder of the line, along with other IND lines. The remainder of the line was built by the Public Works Administration. In 1934 and 1935, construction of the extension to Jamaica was suspended for 15 months and was halted by strikes. Construction was further delayed due to a strike in 1935, instigated by electricians opposing wages paid by the General Railway Signal Company.

During the station's construction, the main road of Queens Boulevard was depressed into underpasses at the intersections with Woodhaven Boulevard and Horace Harding Boulevard (also known as Nassau Boulevard). The easternmost underpass now carries Queens Boulevard below the Long Island Expressway (LIE), which replaced Horace Harding Boulevard.  

In August 1936, tracks were installed all the way to 178th Street, and the stations to Union Turnpike were completed. As a result of the extension, areas in Elmhurst were accessible by subway.

Later years 
The station was originally named "Woodhaven Blvd–Slattery Plaza", after Slattery Plaza, the area where four main Queens thoroughfares (Eliot Avenue and Horace Harding, Woodhaven, and Queens Boulevards) intersected. The plaza, which no longer exists, featured several "mom-and-pop" small businesses. The plaza and subway station were named after Colonel John R. Slattery, former New York City Board of Transportation chief engineer who died in 1932 while supervising the construction of the IND Eighth Avenue Line. The construction of the LIE along the Horace Harding corridor in the 1950s resulted in the demolition of Slattery Plaza, although the name tablets retained the original name even after the plaza's demolition.

Renovation
Queens Center Mall first opened in 1973, but the name convention on subway maps was not in use until the mid-to-late 1980s. The station became dilapidated by the 1980s due to lack of maintenance over the years, and in 1981, the Metropolitan Transportation Authority (MTA) listed the station among the 69 most deteriorated stations in the subway system. The station was also heavily used, serving 15,000 passengers per weekday by 1993.

In April 1991, the entrance at the north side of Queens Boulevard near an overpass of the Long Island Expressway was closed, along with fifteen other entrances across the subway system to reduce crime. In June 1992, subway riders held a protest rally, demanding the reopening of the entrance. In 1993, the Woodhaven Boulevard station began a three-year renovation project as part of a general refurbishment of seventy New York City Subway stations. The refurbishment added a new token booth, new signage and platform edge strips, replaced platform tiles, staircase components, and lighting, and restored the station's restrooms. Four new turnstiles were added at the east end of the station, a new east-end staircase was added to the north side of Queens Boulevard and the west-end staircase was widened. A new public address system was added to the station, the west end token booth was moved closer to the turnstiles and turnstiles equipped for the Automated Fare Collection system were installed. The project was expected to be completed in September 1996. After the renovation, the station retained the now out-of-date "Woodhaven Blvd–Slattery Plaza" name tablets. 

In 2019, as part of an initiative to increase the accessibility of the New York City Subway system, the MTA announced that it would install elevators at the Woodhaven Boulevard station as part of the MTA's 2020–2024 Capital Program. In November 2022, the MTA announced that it would award a $965 million contract for the installation of 21 elevators across eight stations, including Woodhaven Boulevard. A joint venture of ASTM and Halmar International would construct the elevators under a public-private partnership.

Station layout

There are four tracks and two side platforms; the two center express tracks are used by the E and F trains at all times except late nights. At either end of both platforms are bellmouth provisions to allow conversion into an express station. The tunnel wall extends outward to allow space for the two side platforms to be replaced with island platforms, and for the local tracks to be relocated outside the island platforms. The station would have accommodated a major system expansion, with additional service coming from the Roosevelt Avenue Terminal station and the former LIRR Rockaway Line. Requests to convert the station were also put forward by the local community shortly after the station opened, due to heavy bus traffic feeding into the station and overcrowding at the Roosevelt Avenue express stop.

The name tablets on this station still retain the original name of Woodhaven Boulevard–Slattery Plaza. The tilework in this station consists of blue bands with a black border, similar to the tilework found at the Elmhurst Avenue stop, two stations west.

The station's full-length mezzanine allows crossover from any of the station's four staircases from each platform, with a total of eight staircases from the mezzanine to platform level. There is no direct indoor access to the Queens Center Mall's entrance at the northwest corner of Queens Boulevard and 59th Avenue from the mezzanine.

The 1996 artwork here is called In Memory of The Lost Battalion by Pablo Tauler. It uses nine support beams in the station's mezzanine wrapped in different materials— including glass, iron, and stainless steel—to honor the soldiers who served in the 77th Infantry Division during World War I.

Exits
The full-time side at the west end of the mezzanine has three street stairs. One leads to the northeast corner of Queens Boulevard and 59th Avenue, the closest to the mall. The other two staircases are through a long passageway to both southern corners of Queens Boulevard and Woodhaven Boulevard, acting as a pedestrian underpass outside of fare control. These staircases date back to the station's original opening. There is an entrance to the southeast corner of Woodhaven and Queens Boulevards that, as a result of the construction of the Long Island Expressway in the mid-1950s, leads only to two entrance ramps to the expressway, with no continuous sidewalk leading to the entrance.

The part-time portion at the former Horace Harding Boulevard on the east end has a closed and removed booth and one street stair to the north side of Queens Boulevard at 92nd Street. This entrance abuts two expressway ramps and leads to the former Horace Harding Boulevard, now replaced by the LIE exit ramp. This exit still has a directional mosaic pointing to it, listing the exit as 60th Avenue and 92nd Street on the north side of Queens Boulevard. The construction of the Long Island Expressway removed this intersection. This is also a staircase that dates to the station's opening.

There is a closed exit to the south side of Queens Boulevard underneath the Long Island Expressway, between the ramp to the eastbound expressway and Eliot Avenue. It is covered with a trapdoor.

Bus service

The station and the nearby Queens Center Mall are served by nine local MTA Regional Bus Operations routes and two express bus routes. Three of the four Woodhaven Boulevard bus lines (Q11, Q21, Q52 SBS) terminate at the station, with the Q53 SBS bus continuing westward towards the Woodside – 61st Street Station. Except for the Q88, Rego Park-bound Q59, Jamaica-bound Q60, and Corona-bound Q38, all northbound buses stop at the mall entrance, while all southbound buses as well as the QM10 and QM11 express buses stop at Hoffman Drive adjacent to Hoffman Park. The Q88 terminates at 92nd Street, in between the two halves of the mall.

Notes

References

External links 

 
 Station Reporter — R Train
 Station Reporter — M Train
 MTA's Arts For Transit — Woodhaven Boulevard (IND Queens Boulevard Line)
 The Subway Nut — Woodhaven Boulevard Pictures
 Woodhaven Boulevard entrance from Google Maps Street View
 Horace Harding Boulevard (Long Island Expressway) entrance from Google Maps Street View
 Platforms from Google Maps Street View
 Mezzanine from Google Maps Street View

IND Queens Boulevard Line stations
1936 establishments in New York City
New York City Subway stations in Queens, New York
Railway stations in the United States opened in 1936
Elmhurst, Queens